Kristina Persson  (born 16 April 1945) is a Swedish politician of the Social Democrats. She served as Minister for Nordic Cooperation and Minister for Strategic Development, under Prime Minister Stefan Löfven, from October 2014 to May 2016.

Career
Persson started her career in the Ministry of Finance in 1971, moved to the Secretariat for Future Studies and then spent the 1980s in the trade union movement — first at the Swedish Trade Union Confederation (LO), then at the LO-TCO Secretariat of International Trade Union Development, later at the Confederation of Nordic Trade Unions (NFS) secretariat, and finally at the white collar union TCO. During the 1990s, she was an MP and then an MEP, before becoming a county governor and deputy governor of the Swedish central bank. From 2007 she led the think tank Global Challenge, which she had founded herself.

Other activities
European Policy Centre (EPC), Member of the Strategic Council

References

External links

1945 births
Living people
Women government ministers of Sweden
Swedish Social Democratic Party politicians
Swedish female archers
21st-century Swedish women politicians
Swedish women economists
Swedish Ministers for Nordic Cooperation